Rugby Europe Under-18 Sevens Championship is Rugby Europe's annual age group rugby sevens tournament for under-18 national sevens teams. The Welsh Under-18 sevens team made their debut at the 2017 tournament in Germany. They met eventual winners, Ireland, in the semifinals.

Tournament History

Championship

Trophy

References

External links 
 Official website

 
Rugby sevens competitions in Europe
Rugby Europe tournaments